Oliver Fobassam Nawé (born 6 April 2003) is a German professional footballer who plays as a centre-back for 2. Bundesliga club Greuther Fürth.

Club career
Fobassam is a product of the youth academies of Euskirchen, Bayer Leverkusen and Wolfsburg. He transferred to 2. Bundesliga side Greuther Fürth on 26 January 2022, signing a contract until 2024. He made his professional debut with Greuther Fürth as a late substitute in a 1–1 tie with Karlsruher SC in the 2. Bundesliga on 5 August 2022.

Personal life
Fobassam was born in Germany to a Cameroonian father and a German-French mother.

References

External links
 
 
 DFB Profile

2003 births
Living people
People from Brühl (Rhineland)
German footballers
German people of Cameroonian descent
German people of French descent
SpVgg Greuther Fürth players
SpVgg Greuther Fürth II players
2. Bundesliga players
Regionalliga players
Association football defenders